St. Andrew's Episcopal Church is a parish established in Emporia, Kansas on February 14, 1870, as part of the Episcopal Diocese of Kansas. St. Andrew's first building was constructed in the Fall of 1870 and was of a Gothic Revival style. In 1928, the original building was replaced by a larger Gothic Revival architecture building. St. Andrew's will celebrate 150 years of ministry and mission to the Emporia community in 2020.

References

External links 
 

Emporia, Kansas
Episcopal church buildings in Kansas